The Roger Needham award is a prize given scientists who are recognised for important contributions made to computer science research The British Computer Society established an annual Roger Needham Award in honour of Roger Needham in 2004. It is a £5000 prize is presented to an individual for making "a distinguished research contribution in computer science by a UK-based researcher within ten years of their PhD." The award is funded by Microsoft Research. The winner of the prize has an opportunity to give a public lecture.

Laureates
Since 2004, laureates have included:
 2004 Jane Hillston on Tuning Systems: From Composition to Performance
 2005 Ian Horrocks on Ontologies and the Semantic Web
 2006 Andrew Fitzgibbon on Computer Vision & the Geometry of Nature
 2007 Mark Handley on Evolving the Internet: Challenges, Opportunities and Consequences
 2008 Wenfei Fan on A Revival of Data Dependencies for Improving Data Quality
 2009 Byron Cook on Proving that programs eventually do something good
 2010  on Timing is Everything
 2011 Maja Pantić on Machine Understanding of Human Behaviour
 2012  on Memory Safety Proofs for the Masses
 2013  on Theory and Practice: The Yin and Yang of Intelligent Information Systems
 2014  on Mining Biological Networks
 2015  on Linking Form and Function, Computationally
 2016 Sharon Goldwater Language Learning in Humans and Machines: Making Connections to Make Progress
 2017  on Many-Core Programming: How to Go Really Fast Without Crashing
 2018 Alexandra Silva
 2019 
 2020 Jade Alglave

Awards committee
 the prize is judged by an awards committee with the following members:

 Professor  , University of Leeds
 Professor Steve Furber , University of Manchester
 Professor James H. Davenport, University of Bath
 Julia Adamson, Director of Education, BCS
 Professor Dame Muffy Calder , University of Glasgow
 Dr. Martin Sadler  
 Professor Katie Atkinson, University of Liverpool

See also 

 List of computer science awards

References 

Awards established in 2004
British Computer Society
British science and technology awards
2004 establishments in the United Kingdom
Computer science awards